Stine Kurz (born 20 May 2000) is a German field hockey player, who plays as a defender.

Career

Club hockey
In the German Bundesliga, Kurz represents Mannheimer HC.

National teams

Under–21
Stine Kurz made her debut for the German U–21 team in 2019 during a 3 Nations Tournament, held in Viersen and Mönchengladbach. Later that year, she represented the team at the EuroHockey Junior Championship in Valencia, where she won a bronze medal.

Indoor
In 2020, Kurz was a member of the German team at the EuroHockey Indoor Championship in Minsk.

Die Danas
Kurz debuted for Die Danas in 2021, during the third season of the FIH Pro League. In her debut game against Belgium, Kurz also scored her first international goal.

International goals

References

External links
 
 

2000 births
Living people
German female field hockey players
Sportspeople from Stuttgart
Mannheimer HC players
Feldhockey Bundesliga (Women's field hockey) players
21st-century German women